The Jules Wijdenbosch Bridge (Dutch: Jules Wijdenboschbrug), also called Suriname bridge and known locally as Bosje Brug, is a bridge over the Suriname River between the capital city Paramaribo and Meerzorg in the Commewijne District. The bridge is part of the East-West Link, and is named after former president Jules Wijdenbosch. Constructed by Dutch constructor Ballast-Nedam, the bridge has two lanes, is 1504 metres long, and was opened on 20 May 2000.

Gallery

See also

 Coppename Bridge

References

Wijdenboschbrug
Bridges completed in 2000
2000 establishments in Suriname
Commewijne District
Buildings and structures in Paramaribo